Scotura is a genus of moths of the family Notodontidae. It consists of the following species:
annulata species group:
Scotura aeroptera  Miller, 2008
Scotura annulata  (Guérin-Ménéville, 1844) 
Scotura bugabensis  (Druce, 1895) 
auriceps species group:
Scotura atelozona  Prout, 1918
Scotura auriceps  Butler, 1878
Scotura contracta  Dognin, 1923
Scotura delineata  Dognin, 1923
Scotura longigutta  Warren, 1909
Scotura nigrata  Warren, 1906
Scotura nigricaput  Dognin, 1923
Scotura transversa  (Warren, 1906) 
Scotura vestigiata  Prout, 1918
flavicapilla species group:
Scotura abstracta Prout, 1918
Scotura flavicapilla  (Hübner, 1823) 
Scotura fulviceps  (C. and R. Felder, 1874) 
Scotura fusciceps  Warren, 1909
Scotura intermedia  Warren, 1909
Scotura leucophleps  Warren, 1909
Scotura nervosa  Schaus, 1896
Scotura niveilimba  Miller, 2008
Scotura occidentalis  Miller, 2008
Scotura quadripuncta  Miller, 2008
Scotura signata  Hering, 1925
Scotura venata  (Butler, 1877) 

Notodontidae of South America